

Excavations
 "Cave of Letters" at Nahal Hever in the Judaean Desert.
 Fishbourne Roman Palace, West Sussex.
 Floors excavated at the Una Vida great house, Chaco Canyon.
 Cape Gelidonya shipwreck excavation, by Peter Throckmorton, George F. Bass and Frédéric Dumas, begins.
 August: Excavations at Castle Tower, Penmaen, in Wales begin, led by Leslie Alcock of University College Cardiff. Further small-scale work was undertaken at the site the following year and the results published in 1966.

Publications
 Glyn Daniel - The Prehistoric Chamber Tombs of France.

Finds
 Helge Ingstad and Anne Stine Ingstad find apparent Viking site at L'Anse aux Meadows in Newfoundland.
 Tomb of Princess Yongtai found in Qianling Mausoleum, China.
 November 4 - OH 7, first fragments of Homo habilis, discovered by Jonathan Leakey at Olduvai Gorge, Tanzania.
 Azykh cave was discovered by  Mammadali Huseynov in Azerbaijan.

Events
 Chemical tests indicate that the Etruscan terracotta warriors in the Metropolitan Museum of Art, New York, are modern fakes.

Births
 April 21 - Nicholas Thomas, Australian-born British archaeologist of Oceania
 May 11 - Pál Sümegi, Hungarian geoarchaeologist
 September 1 - Eric H. Cline, American Classical archaeologist
 Timothy Taylor, English archaeologist

Deaths
 February 20 - Leonard Woolley, English archaeologist (b. 1880)
 March 11 - Roy Chapman Andrews, American explorer (b. 1884)
 May 13 - Antonios Keramopoulos, Greek archaeologist (b. 1870)
 October 6 - Karel Absolon, Czech archaeologist (b. 1877)

See also
 List of years in archaeology
 1959 in archaeology
 1961 in archaeology

References

Archaeology
Archaeology
Archaeology by year